The American University of Phnom Penh (AUPP; ,) is a private English-medium university founded in August 2013, with a campus in Phnom Penh, Cambodia. The university currently offers four-year American dual degree programs  as well as stand-alone Bachelor's and MBA programs.

History
The vision for AUPP originated with Dr. Chea Vandeth along with Dr. Kem Reat Viseth, the former Director of the School of Graduate Studies of the National School of Management, and Dr. Kenneth Dunn, a Fulbright Scholar to Cambodia, who together conceptualized a new university that would embody international best practices and offer academic programs of the highest quality. AUPP was organized as a non-profit institution with the mission of contributing to the human resource development of Cambodia. In 2013, AUPP began operations with 40 students at a temporary campus in Toul Kork.

A Board of Trustees was formed to direct the course of the University and oversee its development. At the same time, an International Advisory Board was created, including experienced educators, administrators, and business leaders from the U.S. and Cambodia. This board advises AUPP on its management, governance, academic structures, programs, and services.

AUPP has further solidified a Micro Campus and Dual Degree agreement with the University of Arizona and a Dual Degree agreement with Fort Hays State University. These agreements allow Cambodian students to receive accredited American degrees without leaving Cambodia.

AUPP’s first President, Dr. Sharon Siverts, was appointed in July 2014. The University's second President, Dr. Kenneth Dunn, was appointed in 2016 and served until 2021. Mr. Dararith Lim has been the Group President and Chief Executive Officer since March 2021.

AUPP offers numerous scholarships based on financial need to support the educational dreams of young scholars without the financial means to do so. https://www.aupp.edu.kh/tuition-scholarships-financial-aid-loans/aupp-scholarships/

Campus
AUPP was relocated to its new campus located at 278H Street 201R, Russei Kéo, Phnom Penh, Cambodia, in the middle of 2017.

Academics
AUPP signed a Micro Campus agreement with University of Arizona (UA) and a Dual Degree agreement with Fort Hays State University (FHSU) at the AUPP campus in Phnom Penh, under which they will enter into a cooperative arrangement to deliver dual degree programs to AUPP students. This is the first time that a U.S. degree can be completed by Cambodian students entirely in Cambodia. The programs offered by AUPP with U of A and FHSU are “dual degrees”, meaning that students who finish four years of study at AUPP will receive one bachelor's degree from AUPP and another from the American Partner University. This agreement also allows AUPP students to study abroad at UA or at FHSU in the United States for one or two semesters, depending on their choice of major.

AUPP offers the following majors in partnership with the University of Arizona or Fort Hays State University:

 English Preparatory Program 
 Bachelor of Science in Business in Management, Marketing, Finance, and Accounting (Dual Degree with University of Arizona)
 Bachelor of Arts in Law (Dual Degree with University of Arizona)
 Bachelor of Business Administration in  Tourism & Hospitality Management (Dual Degree with Fort Hays State University)
 Bachelor of Science in Information Technology Management (Dual Degree with Fort Hays State University)
 Bachelor of Arts in Global Affairs (AUPP degree)
 Bachelor of Science in Information and Communications Technology (AUPP degree)
 Master of Business Administration (AUPP degree)

Minors in the following disciplines:
Law
Economics
Southeast Asian Studies

Student life

AUPP’s student clubs include an IT club, yoga club, movie making club, football club, and several others.  Students are also involved in service-learning projects (social responsibility). The elected student government provides leadership opportunities, organizes field trips, and organizes a speaker series which further round out students’ education.

References

Education in Phnom Penh
Universities in Cambodia
2013 establishments in Cambodia
Educational institutions established in 2013
Cambodia–United States relations